{{Infobox comics creator
| image         = 4.11.15DavidGallaherByLuigiNovi1.jpg
| imagesize     = 
| caption       = Gallaher at the 2015 East Coast Comicon in Secaucus, New Jersey
| birth_date    =
| birth_name    = David Matthew Gallaher
| birth_place   = Honolulu, Hawaii, U.S.
| death_date    =
| death_place   =
| nationality   = American
| cartoonist    =
| write         = y
| art           =
| pencil        =
| ink           =
| edit          =y
| publish       =
| letter        =
| color         =
| alias         = Dave GallaherDr. Gallaher(miscredited as Ken Wolak, David Gallagher)
| notable works = 'Tom Clancy's Ghost Recon Breakpoint,Vampire: The MasqueradeYours Truly, Johnny DollarHigh MoonBox 13Hulk: Winter Guard| awards        = 2007 Creative Excellence in Advertising AwardComic Foundry Breakout Creator of 082008 Creative Excellence in Advertising Award2009 Creative Excellence in Advertising Award2009 Harvey Award for High Moon| website       = http://www.davidgallaher.com
}}
David Matthew Gallaher (born June 5, 1975, in Honolulu) is an American video game writer, graphic novelist, podcaster and editor, known primarily for his work in comics and video games: Tom Clancy's Ghost Recon Breakpoint, Vampire: The Masquerade, Yours Truly, Johnny Dollar, High Moon, Box 13, The Only Living Boy and 'The Only Living Girl'.  His clients include Marvel Comics, the CBLDF, Harris Publications and McGraw-Hill. He also helped create ad campaigns for the New York City Police Department.

Early life
Gallaher's family did not own a television until he was five years old. The first film he saw was the 1978 Superman movie. When his family finally obtained a television, he enjoyed Shazam!, Spider-Man and His Amazing Friends, Super Friends, The Incredible Hulk and Batman. Shortly after, he read his first comic Power Man and Iron Fist. When he was 7, his mother bought a book for Gallaher which featured superhero designs one could trace.

During Boy Scout summer camp in '88, Gallaher and became an avid reader of Captain America, Fantastic Four, West Coast Avengers, and Speedball. Gallaher cites John Byrne's "Vision Quest" storyline in West Coast Avengers as a story that had significant influence on him. He became a fan of Byrne's, particularly his work on Namor.

A graduate of Frederick High School, Gallaher attended Hood College in Maryland, double-majoring in both Special Education and Psychology. During his junior year, despite his love for teaching, he felt compelled to write. He switched to Goddard College on learning that David Mamet, William H. Macy, and Piers Anthony studied there. The school allowed him to create his own curriculum to major in Comics. He also taught a comics class to seniors and juniors with the work of Garth Ennis and Warren Ellis included as part of the curriculum.

Career

After graduating from Goddard, Gallaher drew a crude version of his résumé as a six-panel comic strip and faxed it to Marvel Comics. The next day, he received a call to work at Marvel as an intern for the Interactive and Marketing department. After a week, he was hired as the department production editor, editing digital comics, training interns, researching material, writing character biographies and developing websites.

His work as a creator at Marvel includes Hulk: Winter Guard and Darkstar and the Winter Guard.

In late 2001, Gallaher met Joe Gentile of Moonstone Books at the Detroit Motor City Comic Con. Gentile encouraged Gallahar to submit for the Moonstone Noir Line and was hired to write Yours Truly, Johnny Dollar. He wrote single issues of comics for Annex (Chalk Outline Studios), Immortals Gods and Heroes (Archaia), Deadlands (IDW and Image Comics), More Fund Comics (Sky Dog Press), and Vampirella #8-10 (Harris). He also wrote  articles for Marvel Comics and Visual Opinions Magazine.

In advertising, Gallaher worked on several successful campaigns for the New York Police Department including a multimedia presentation CD Rom which won the 2007 CEA Award, and the 2008 "My NYPD" and "Only in NY, Only in The NYPD" campaigns which also won CEA Awards in 2008 and 2009. He also worked on books about marketing and computers, such as Introduction to Web Databases and Networking Tools 2.0.

In 2008, Gallaher was named as a 'Breakout Creator' by Comic Foundry magazine. In October 2009, Gallaher earned a Harvey Award for his work on the series High Moon.

In July 2011, Gallaher worked as consulting editor on a broad range of titles for Kodansha including Sailor Moon, Gon, Negima and Arisa. In July 2012, he and artist Steve Ellis formed Bottled Lightning Studios to self-publish their comics. Gallaher wrote 2 issues of Green Lantern Corps for DC Comics during the "Convergence" storyline.

In 2018, Papercutz announced it would publish the spin-off series to The Only Living Boy, The Only Living Girl with David Gallaher and Steve Ellis resuming their young-adult children's adventure series.

In February 2019, Gallaher became the co-host of the For The Love Of Comics podcast with Adam Vermillion. In June 2019, it was announced that David Gallaher would be one of the writers on Ubisoft's Ghost Recon series.

In October 2019, Gallaher and his studio were hired by the Children's Tumor Foundation to release a series of comic strips to promote the awareness of neurofibromatosis.

Awards
Gallaher's creation High Moon (with collaborator Steve Ellis and Scott O. Brown) won the "Best Online Comic" and was nominated for a ‘Best New Series’ Harvey Award for 2009.
Gallaher's was again nominated for a 2010 Harvey Award for "Best Online Comic" for High Moon 
Gallaher (with collaborator Steve Ellis and Scott O. Brown) was nominated for a 2014 Harvey Award for "The Only Living Boy" in the "Best Graphic Publication for Young Readers" category
Gallaher was nominated for a 2016 Harvey Award for "The Only Living Boy" in the "Best Graphic Publication for Young Readers" category
Gallaher's work The Only Living Boy Omnibus received a nomination for "Best Presentation in Design" category
Gallaher's (and his team's work) on Ghost Recon: Breakpoint received the 'Best PC Game' in the Gamescom Awards 2019.

Personal life
Gallaher claims to have epilepsy.Gallaher, David (March 8, 2016). "How a Brush With Death Inspired The Only Living Boy". gizmodo. Gallaher lives with his spouse, Val D'Orazio, whom he married in 2011, in Brooklyn, New York.

Bibliography

Amazon Studios
 It Came In The Mail storyboards with artist Steve Ellis

Archaia
 Immortals: Gods & Heroes with artist Kevin Colden

Bottled Lightning
 The Altern80s with artist Kevin Colden

comiXology
 Box 13 (with artist and co-creator Steve Ellis)
 Box 13: The Pandora Process (with artist and co-creator Steve Ellis)

DC Comics
 High Moon - Zuda webcomic imprint (with artist and co-creator Steve Ellis)
 Green Lantern Corps (with artist and co-creator Steve Ellis)

Image Comics
 Deadlands: The Devil's Six Gun (with artist and co-creator Steve Ellis)

Marvel Comics
 Iron Man: Threaded Web
 Untold Tales of Spider-Man: Threaded Web
 Hulk: Winter Guard
 Darkstar and The Winter GuardMoonstone Books
 Vampire: The Masquerade Blood and Shadows
 Yours Truly, Jonny Dollar: The Brief Candle Matter
 Moonstone Monsters: Ghosts (incorrectly credited as Ken Wolak)

Papercutz
 The Only Living Boy (with artist and co-creator Steve Ellis)
 The Only Living Girl'' (with artist and co-creator Steve Ellis)

Skydog Press
 More Fund Comics

Ubisoft
 Ghost Recon: Wildlands
 Ghost Recon: Breakpoint

Notes

References

External links

Yours Truly, Johnny Dollar graphic novel illustrated by Eric Theriault, written by David Gallaher

Interviews
Interview at 2008's New York Comic Con with comiXology
Podcast interview with David at comiXology
 CBEM: Interview With David Gallaher

1975 births
American male bloggers
American bloggers
Goddard College alumni
Hood College alumni
Writers from Brooklyn
Writers from Honolulu
Living people
American webcomic creators
American comics writers
Marvel Comics people
People with epilepsy